Sal Khurd is a village in Shaheed Bhagat Singh Nagar district of Punjab State, India. The village is administrated by Sarpanch an elected representative of the village.

Demography 
As of 2011, Sal Khurd has a total number of 84 houses and population of 405 of which 207 include are males while 198 are females according to the report published by Census India in 2011. The literacy rate of Sal Khurd is 79.96% higher than the state average of 75.84%. The population of children under the age of 6 years is 56 which is 13.83% of total population of Sal Khurd, and child sex ratio is approximately 750 as compared to Punjab state average of 846.

Most of the people are from Schedule Caste which constitutes 77.78% of total population in Sal Khurd. The town does not have any Schedule Tribe population so far.

As per the report published by Census India in 2011, 138 people were engaged in work activities out of the total population of Sal Khurd which includes 117 males and 21 females. According to census survey report 2011, 47.83% workers describe their work as main work and 52.17% workers are involved in Marginal activity providing livelihood for less than 6 months.

Education 
The village has no school and children either travel or walk to other villages for schooling often covering . Amardeep Singh Shergill Memorial college Mukandpur, KC Engineering College and Doaba Khalsa Trust Group Of Institutions are the nearest colleges.

List of schools nearby
Govt Primary School, Sal Kalan
Govt Primary School, Atari
Govt Upper Primary School, Heon
Govt Upper Primary School, Jandiala

Transport 

See also 
List of villages in India

References

External links 
 Tourism of Punjab
 Census of Punjab
 Locality Based PINCode

Villages in Shaheed Bhagat Singh Nagar district